The Farnell ministry was the eighteenth ministry of the Colony of New South Wales, and was led by James Farnell. Farnell was first elected to the New South Wales Legislative Assembly in 1860.

The eighth parliament had been a challenging environment, where neither Sir John Robertson nor Sir Henry Parkes had been able to maintain the confidence of the Legislative Assembly. The 1877 election did not resolve the issue with neither Robertson nor Parkes obtaining a majority. Instead the government was formed by Farnell as a compromise Premier.

The title of Premier was widely used to refer to the Leader of the Government, but was not a formal ministerial office until 1920.

There was no party system in New South Wales politics until 1887. Under the constitution, ministers were required to resign to recontest their seats in a by-election when appointed. Such ministerial by-elections were usually uncontested and on this occasion a poll was required for Yass Plains (Michael Fitzpatrick) and he was easily re-elected. The six other ministers, James Farnell (St Leonards), Henry Cohen (West Maitland), Joseph Leary (The Murrumbidgee), John Sutherland (Paddington), William Suttor Jr. (East Macquarie) and John Burns (The Hunter), were re-elected unopposed.

This ministry covers the period from 18 December 1877 until 20 December 1878, when Farnell resigned following his inability to gain safe passage of a land bill through Parliament. Sir Henry Parkes succeeded Farnell as Leader of the Government.

Composition of ministry

Ministers are members of the Legislative Assembly unless otherwise noted.

See also

James Farnell - eighth Premier of New South Wales
Self-government in New South Wales
Members of the New South Wales Legislative Assembly, 1877–1880

References

New South Wales ministries
1877 establishments in Australia
1878 disestablishments in Australia